Turid Thomassen (born 19 April 1965) is a Norwegian politician who was party leader of the Norwegian Red party from 2010 to 2012, succeeding Torstein Dahle.

Born in Stathelle, Telemark, Thomassen works in the administration offices of the Department for Television Education and Film Science at the Lillehammer University College, where she is also the highest union representative for the Norwegian Civil Service Union.

Since 1999, she has been a member of Lillehammer city council and at the Norwegian parliamentary election in 2009, she was her party's first candidate on the county ballot for Oppland.

Thomassen was elected as party leader of Red at the party's general assembly on 30 May 2010 after many years as member of Red Youth, Red Electoral Alliance and the Workers' Communist Party. Hun ble etterfulgt av Bjørnar Moxnes som ny partileder 6. mai 2012.

References

Living people
1965 births
Red Party (Norway) politicians
Norwegian trade unionists
Norwegian women in politics
Leaders of political parties in Norway
People from Bamble
People from Stathelle
Academic staff of Lillehammer University College